Norape fuscoapicata is a moth of the Megalopygidae family. It was described by Paul Dognin in 1924.

References

Moths described in 1924
Megalopygidae